The Lancer 39 is an American sailboat that was designed by Herb David as an motorsailer and a cruiser and first built in 1982.

Production
The design was built by Lancer Yachts in the United States, from 1982 to 1983, but it is now out of production.

Design
The Lancer 39 is a recreational keelboat, built predominantly of fiberglass, with wood trim. It has a masthead sloop rig, a raked stem, a plumb transom, with a fixed swimming platform, a pilothouse, a skeg-mounted rudder controlled by a wheel and a fixed fin keel. It displaces  and carries  of ballast.

See also
List of sailing boat types

References

External links
Photo of a Lancer 39 on cradle, showing keel and rudder

Keelboats
Motorsailers
1980s sailboat type designs
Sailing yachts
Sailboat type designs by Herb David
Sailboat types built by Lancer Yachts